Bình Tân may refer to several places in Vietnam, including:

Bình Tân District, Ho Chi Minh City, an urban district of Ho Chi Minh City
Bình Tân District, Vĩnh Long Province, a rural district of Vĩnh Long Province
Bình Tân, La Gi, a ward of La Gi, Bình Thuận Province
Bình Tân, Đắk Lắk, a ward of Buôn Hồ
Bình Tân, Long An, a commune of Kiến Tường
Bình Tân, Bắc Bình, a commune of Bắc Bình District, Bình Thuận Province
Bình Tân, Quảng Ngãi, a commune of Bình Sơn District
Bình Tân, Tiền Giang, a commune of Gò Công Tây District
Bình Tân, Bình Phước, a commune of Phú Riềng District
Bình Tân, Bình Định, a commune of Tây Sơn District

See also
Bình Tấn, a commune of Thanh Bình District, Đồng Tháp Province